The April Revolution was the 1960 uprising in South Korea.

April Revolution may also refer to:

April Revolution (Venezuela), Venezuelan civil war in 1870.
25 April Revolution, armed revolution, in Portugal, that overthrew the dictatorship
April Uprising, insurrection organised by the Bulgarians in the Ottoman Empire from April to May 1876
Saur Revolution, the April 1978 Communist revolution in Afghanistan
The April protests of the 2006 democracy movement in Nepal
The April 2010 Kyrgyzstani revolution